Lauchhammer is a town in the Oberspreewald-Lausitz district, in southern Brandenburg, Germany. It is situated on the Black Elster river, approx. 17 km west of Senftenberg, and 50 km north of Dresden.

History
From 1815 to 1944, Lauchhammer was part of the Prussian Province of Saxony and from 1944 to 1945 of the Province of Halle-Merseburg. From 1947 to 1952 it was part of Saxony-Anhalt and from 1952 to 1990 of the Bezirk Cottbus of East Germany.

Demography

Transport

Lauchhammer lies on the Węgliniec–Roßlau railway and offers connections to Leipzig and Cottbus.

Notable people
 Sven Benken (born 1970), footballer
 Hans-Joachim Brauske (born 1943), boxer
 Danny Breitfelder (born 1997), footballer
 Thomas Gumpert (1952–2021), actor
 Klaus Haertter (born 1952), fencer
 Stefan Härtel (born 1988), boxer
 Jens Kunath (born 1967), footballer
 Annett Neumann (born 1970), track cyclist
 Magdalena Schmidt (born 1949), gymnast
 Sebastian Schuppan (born 1986), footballer
 Mario Veit (born 1973), boxer
 Annelore Zinke (born 1958), gymnast
 Martin Zurawsky (born 1990), footballer

References

Populated places in Oberspreewald-Lausitz